White defensiveness is a term to describe defensive responses by white people to discussions of societal discrimination, structural racism, and white privilege. The term has been applied to characterize the responses of white people to portrayals of the Atlantic slave trade and European colonization, or scholarship on the legacy of those systems in modern society. Academics and historians have identified multiple forms of white defensiveness, including white denial, white diversion, and white fragility, the last of which was popularized by scholar Robin DiAngelo.

White defensiveness refers to the occurrence in which white people display highly defensive responses when confronted with truths regarding race and related power structures, and privilege. In particular, white people display substantially uneasy responses when questioned about racial dynamics (i.e. instances of possible racism). It acts as a self-protective strategy to conceal grief, trauma, and intergenerational trauma.

Definition
White defensiveness describes some of the perceived responses when white people are confronted with issues involving race and racism. Academics have proposed subtypes of white defensiveness, such as white denial, white diversion, and white fragility. There are also varied contexts and descriptions of what can cause the expression of this theorized defensiveness. For example, political scientists Angie Maxwell and Todd Shields have proposed that the examination of white privilege "triggers white defensiveness".

Academics, such as Robin DiAngelo, Julia Chinyere Oparah, George Yancy and Leah Gaskin Fitchue, have detailed ranges of what they define as white defensive responses in their works.

Subtypes

White denial
White denial has been identified as a defensive response by white people, in which realities of inequality are denied or downplayed. One example is the claim that racism simply does not exist. Historically, it has also taken more extreme forms such as the suggestion that slavery in the United States was a benign system or even had a civilizing effect on African Americans. Regarding white denial, the theologian Leah Gaskin Fitchue wrote in 2015:

While denial links to implicit and unconscious bias. White denial may also be driven by white guilt which suggests that acknowledgement of the existence of discrimination or racism against another group may be identity threatening for members of dominant and majority groups. 

By its very nature, denial is a defense mechanism, a distortion of reality, a delusional projection to reshape reality in a way one desires to see it. James Perkinson's study, White Theology, counters white denial in calling for a "white theology of responsibility (agreeing with Cone) that a serious engagement with history and culture must be at the heart of any American projection of integrity"...

The philosopher George Yancy has spoken of his experiences of white denial in academia and within responses to his works, such as his 2015 article Dear White America. From her 1998 research, professor Julia Chinyere Oparah proposed that when "white feminists cease to respond to challenges from black women with counter-attack and defensiveness" that anti-racism efforts can progress "beyond white denial" by "acknowledging that white feminists, as individuals, often silence, ignore or otherwise oppress black women."

Robin DiAngelo has argued that social pressure on people of color to "collude with white fragility" accommodates other forms of white defensiveness, in particular "white denial".

White diversion
White diversion is a term coined by the academic Max Harris to denote a phenomenon in which white people may obstruct dialogue or acknowledgement of race-based discrimination by redirecting or comparing the subject to other social issues. That proposed form of white defensiveness can seek to reorient blame towards people of color and indigenous peoples, rather than address the role of white people. Harris, a University of Oxford Fellow, suggests that when "racism or colonisation are raised, the conversation is derailed." 

Max Harris is the author of the book titled “The New Zealand Project”. He is based in New Zealand, but his background is from the United Kingdom.  He believes that to name whiteness is to name dominance as it’s often connected to backgrounds. He believes there are four types of white defensiveness and that includes denial, diversion, detriment-centring, and the demand to move on. These terms were created due to Max witnessing the “Maori” people of New Zealand experiencing hostility towards them in as early as the 1990’s.  The term is similar to the concept of “reverse racism” as the Maori people become often portrayed negatively when any aspect of racism is raised.

White fragility

Robin DiAngelo has theorized that as the mainstream perception of racism implies a conscious "meanness", racism's definition is the cause of practically all white defensiveness. DiAngelo, who coined the term "white fragility" in the early 2010s and later released her 2018 book White Fragility, describes "white fragility" as a range of defensive responses by white people. According to Robin DiAngelo, white people react to "racial stress" with an "outward display of emotions such as anger, fear, and guilt, and behaviors such as argumentation, silence, and leaving the stress-inducing situation". DiAngelo theorized that this reaction served to "reinstate white racial equilibrium".  

The term has since been analyzed in academia and described in media as a distinct range of expressions by many white people in a number of historical settings up to modern times. The term is often tied to the idea of structural racism. The Washington Post critic Carlos Lozada endorsed the concept but found DiAngelo's book flawed. The book was criticized by the American linguist John McWhorter, who argued that it "openly infantilized Black people".

The journalist Peter Baker argues that "white fragility" can be expressed by silence or shutting down; denial; accusations of reverse racism; or upset, anger, or rage at an interpersonal level. The latter individualistic form of response is not, however, to be confused with the terms "white backlash" or "white rage", which refer to exclusionary or violent group reactions by some whites to the societal progression of people of color.

History

European colonialism and slavery
Max Harris has observed the phenomenon in the politics of New Zealand. Referring to this form of white defensiveness as "Diversion", some white New Zealanders deflect attention onto the pre-Pākehā settlers era before colonization by ascribing an unrelated guilt or culpability to Māori people.

In 1800, a failed rebellion planned by the slave Gabriel Prosser caused both a drop in support for anti-slavery societies, which had been petitioning against structural racism, and an increase in white defensiveness in the Upper South. In the post-slavery United States, there has historically been frustration from African American communities at white defensiveness and its consequences causing a lack of accountability.

Study of phenomenon
Multiple studies have explored how white defensiveness, intersecting with whiteness, operates in areas of society, such as education. Cynthia Levine-Rasky's 2011 research showed how an unconscious white defensiveness is often present in traditional teaching candidates in the West.

Types of expression

Reverse racism
Cameron McCarthy argues that a form of defensiveness can be an insistence on a relativistic view of history in which white people are also the victims of historical oppression and racism. In the late 1990s, Professor Paul Orlowski observed the emergence of white defensiveness in working-class communities of British Columbia, Canada, where investigating structural racism in the province led to accusations of being "anti-white".

Terminologist barriers
Some assert that the use of technical terms from critical theory (such as "white privilege" and "white fragility") may prevent proper engagement with the social phenomena involved with structural racism. In 2019, as reported by Professor Lauren Michele Jackson, the writer Claudia Rankine abandoned attempts to document conversations with white men, due to her perception that the use of accurate terminology was actually providing somewhat of a barrier to progress and further enabling white defensiveness.

Explicit, or conscious bias 
In explicit bias, the person is fully aware and understands the ramifications of their actions and intentions. These actions might look different, like deliberate acts of exclusion, verbal or physical harassment, or derogatory or exclusive language, but all are processed consciously by the acting subject.

Implicit, or unconscious bias 
Implicit bias comes from outside the person’s conscious understanding of themselves and the world, and can be in direct conflict with their expressed opinions and beliefs. Even though it may not be fully understood by the acting subject, this bias influences how people process decisions and make judgements, especially in cases where the acting subject is making a quick decision or is under duress.  

White Diversion can be an example of both conscious and unconscious bias, depending on the type and the situation. For instance, a knee jerk response may come from a place of unconscious bias, however denial and diversion are often more rooted in conscious bias. The underlying distinction comes from the acting subject’s intentions.

See also
 Cultural identity
 Grievance politics
 Racial-ethnic socialization
 Resistance (psychoanalysis)
 Social identity
 White backlash
 White identity
 White identity politics
 White Racial Identity Development
 Whiteness theory
 White supremacy
 Racism in the United States

References

Critical race theory
Racism
Politics and race
Post-structuralism
Social phenomena
Social psychology
White culture
White privilege